Catawissa may refer to the following:

Catawissa, Missouri, an unincorporated community
, a registered historic place in Waterford, New York
Catawissa, Pennsylvania, a borough in Columbia County
Catawissa Township, Columbia County, Pennsylvania, located in the above borough
Catawissa Friends Meetinghouse, located in the above borough
Catawissa Bottling Company, located in the above borough
Catawissa Creek, a tributary of the North Branch Susquehanna River in Pennsylvania